Steve Holland may refer to:

 Steve Holland (actor) (1925–1997), American actor and model
 Steve Holland (politician) (born 1955), member of the Mississippi House of Representatives
 Savage Steve Holland (born 1958), American animator, film and television director
 Steve Holland (footballer) (born 1970), English football (soccer) coach
 Steve Holland (writer) (born 1968), American television writer and producer
 Stephen Holland (born 1958), Australian swimmer
 Stephen Holland (artist) (born 1941), American artist
 Steve Holland (musician) (1954–2020), guitarist for Molly Hatchet
 Steven M. Holland (born 1962), American paleontologist and geologist